Dennis Utter (February 21, 1939 – December 27, 2011) was an American politician and a member of the unicameral Nebraska Legislature.

Birth
Dennis Utter was born on February 21, 1939, in Wheatland, Wyoming.

Residence
Utter's hometown is Hastings, Nebraska.

Religion
Utter was Presbyterian.

Family
Utter was married to Kathryn Preuit, and they had three children named Mark, Ward, and Denise.

Education
Utter received his education at the following institutions:
 BS, Agriculture, University of Wyoming
 MS, Agricultural Economics, University of Wyoming
 Graduate, Colorado School of Banking

Organizations
Utter was a member of the following organizations:
 Board Member, Adams County Senior Servies
 Past President, Kenesaw Community Club
 Past President/Member, Kenesaw Public Schools Foundation
 Board Member, Mary Lanning Health Care Foundation
 Past President, Nebraska Bankers Association
 Past Member, Nebraska Bankers Association/American Bankers Association
 Past Member, University of Nebraska Medical Center Board of Councilors

State legislature
Utter was elected in 2008 to represent the 33rd Nebraska legislative district. He was a member of the Banking, Commerce and Insurance committee, the Revenue committee, and Rules committees.  Utter was replaced by Hastings lawyer Les Seiler, who was sworn in on January 14, 2012, following the second week of the 2012 legislative session.

Death
Utter died in 2011 at the age of 72 from lung disease.

See also

 Nebraska Legislature

References

Sources
 

2011 deaths
1939 births
Nebraska state senators
People from Wheatland, Wyoming
People from Hastings, Nebraska
Deaths from lung disease
University of Wyoming alumni